The Bamboo mosaic potexvirus (BaMV) cis-regulatory element represents a cloverleaf-like cis-regulatory element found in the 3' UTR of the bamboo mosaic virus. This family is thought to play an important role in the initiation of minus-strand RNA synthesis and may also be involved in the regulation of viral replication.

See also 
 Bamboo mosaic virus satellite RNA cis-regulatory element

References

External links 
 

Cis-regulatory RNA elements
Potexviruses